The Ministry of Food (Khādya mantraṇālaẏa) is the government ministry of Bangladesh responsible for  National Food Policy.

History
The Ministry of Food was originally the Ministry of Food & Civil Supplies in 1971 after the Independence of Bangladesh. It was renamed to Ministry of Food & Relief and then renamed again as the Ministry of Food & Disaster Management. In 2012 the government of Bangladesh reorganized it as the Ministry of Food and another separate ministry was created called the Ministry of Disaster Management.

Departments
 Directorate General of Food

References

 
Food
2012 establishments in Bangladesh
Organisations based in Dhaka
Food and drink in Bangladesh
Consumer ministries